Per Atle Kolstad (born 25 April 1953 in Norway) is a Norwegian musician (piano & keyboards), known from the band Lava, Jonas Fjeld Band and Prima Vera, and has numerous recordings as a studio musician.

Career 
Kolstad has collaborated with singers and musicians like Jan Groth, Odd Nordstoga, Olav Stedje, Steinar Albrigtsen, Marius Müller, Gry Jannicke Jarlum, Tor Endresen, Bjørn Eidsvåg, Finn Kalvik, Sissel Kyrkjebø and Alf Cranner. He was also keyboardist within the band Son of Sam. In 1984 he received Spellemannprisen as part of the band Lava for their album Fire.

Kolstad is an associate professor at the Agder University College (2013).

Honors 
1984: Spellemannprisen in the class Pop, within Lava

Discography

Lava albums 
Within Lava
1982: Prime Time (Polydor Records) 
1984: Fire (Polydor Records)
1985: Prime Cuts (Polydor Records), Compilation
1990: Rhythm of Love (Polydor Records)
1996: The Very Best of Lava (Polydor Records), Compilation
2003: Polarity (Polydor Records)
2005: Alibi (Polydor Records)
2009: Symphonic Journey (Polydor Records), live album

Collaborations 
With Alex
1980: Daddy's Child (Polydor Records)

With Stein Ove Berg
1981: Bergtatt (NorDisc)

With Olav Stedje
1982: Tredje Stedje (Hot Line)
2006: Livstegn (Tylden & Co)
2011: Ikkje Utan Deg (Tylden & Co)

With Kjell Fjalsett
1982: Forandring (New Song)

With Terje Bakke & Test 1
1983: Høyt Spill (Test Records)

Within Silhouette
1984: Silhouette (RCA Victor)

Within Doxa
1984: Så Langt... (Klango Records)
1986: Noe Som Spirer (Scan Music)

With Jonas Fjeld Band
1985: Neck'n Neck (EMI Records)
1993: Texas Jensen (Stageway Records)

With Lill Lindfors
1985: Människors Makt (Slagerfabrikken)

Within Mr. Walker And The Walkmen
1985: Walking (CBS Records)

With Sissel Kyrkjebø
1986: Sissel (Noahs Ark)
1986: Glade Jul (Noahs Ark)
1994: Se Ilden Lyse (Forenede Fonogramprodusenter)

With Pål Thowsen
1986: Call Me Stranger (Polydor Records)

With Anne Grete Preus
1988: Fullmåne (Warner Music Norway)

With Rita Eriksen
1988: Back From Wonderland (Desperado Records)

With Egil Eldøen
1988: Here We Go Again (Sonet Records)

With Tom Russell Band
1989: Poor Man's Dream (Sonet Records)

With Geirr Lystrup & Maj Britt Andersen
1990: Maurits Og Den Store Barnålkrigen (Juni Records)

With Ketil Bjørnstad
1991: Rift - En Rockopera (Hete Blikk)

With Bjørn Eidsvåg
1993: Allemannsland (Norsk Plateproduksjon)

With Steinar Albrigtsen
1994: The Troubadour (Norsk Plateproduksjon)

With Jack Lewis
1996: Don't Mess Around (Rough Diamond Productions)

With Elisabeth Andreassen
1996: Bettans Jul (Polydor Records)

With Espen Lind
1997: Red (Universal Music), on the track «Niki's Theme»

With Hilde Heltberg
1997: Blant Konger Og Lus (Mega Records)

With Ole Paus
1997: Hellige Natt - Jul I Skippergata (Kirkelig Kulturverksted)

References

20th-century Norwegian pianists
21st-century Norwegian pianists
Spellemannprisen winners
Norwegian jazz pianists
Norwegian jazz composers
Male jazz composers
Academic staff of the University of Agder
Living people
1953 births
Norwegian male pianists
20th-century Norwegian male musicians
21st-century Norwegian male musicians
Lava (band) members